Chorizema ilicifolium, commonly known as the holly flame pea, is a flowering plant in the family Fabaceae.  It is an upright to spreading small shrub with yellowish-orange and red pea flowers occurring from July to October. It is endemic to Western Australia where it grows on sand dunes and hills along the south-west coastline.

Taxonomy and naming 
Holly flame pea was first formally described in 1800 by Jacques Labillardière and the description was published in Relation du Voyage a la Recherche de la Perouse.The specific epithet (ilicifolium) means "holly leaved ".

References

Mirbelioids
Fabales of Australia
Flora of Western Australia
Garden plants of Australia
Plants described in 1800
Taxa named by Jacques Labillardière